The New York State Capitol, the seat of the New York state government, is located in Albany, the capital city of the U.S. state of New York. The capitol building is part of the Empire State Plaza complex on State Street in Capitol Park. Housing the New York State Legislature, the building was completed in 1899 at a cost of US$25 million (equivalent to $ in modern dollars), making it the most expensive government building of its time. It was listed on the National Register of Historic Places in 1971, then included as a contributing property when the Lafayette Park Historic District was listed in 1978. The New York State Capitol was declared a National Historic Landmark in 1979.

History

Legislative sessions had been held at different buildings in different places before Albany was declared the State capital in 1797. From that time until 1811, the State Legislature met at the Old Albany City Hall. The first State Capitol was designed by Albany native Philip Hooker, started in 1804, inaugurated in 1812 and remained in use until 1879 when the current building was inaugurated.

The present Capitol was built between 1867 and 1899. Three teams of architects worked on the design of the Capitol during the 32 years of its construction, managed by: Thomas Fuller (1867–1875), Leopold Eidlitz and Henry Hobson Richardson (1875–1883), and Isaac G. Perry (1883–1899). Fuller, the initial architect, was an Englishman who also designed the Canadian Parliament buildings of Parliament Hill, Ottawa.

The state capitol's ground floor was built in the Classical/Romanesque style. Lieutenant Governor William Dorsheimer then dismissed Fuller in favor of Eidlitz and Richardson who built the next two floors in a Renaissance Classical style, noticeable on the exterior two floors as light, open columnwork. The increasing construction costs became an ongoing source of conflict in the legislature, and it was difficult to secure the necessary funding. Eidlitz and Richardson were dismissed by Grover Cleveland upon his election to governorship and his review of the increasing costs of construction. He hired Perry to complete the project. The legislative chambers, the fourth floor and roof work were all finished in Victorian-modified Romanesque that was distinctively Richardson's design. It "was Richardson who dominated the final outcome of the grand building, which evolved into his distinguished Romanesque style" (which came to be known as Richardsonian Romanesque). It is claimed Richardson was imitating the Hôtel de Ville (City Hall) in Paris, France. The Chazy limestone for its construction was quarried at the Clark Quarry in Essex County, New York.

The central open court is dominated by a shaft intended to support a massive dome. The dome and tower were never completed, as it was found the building's weight was causing stress fractures and making the building shift downhill toward State Street. The Capitol exterior is made of white granite from Hallowell, Maine, and the building incorporates Westchester marble cut by state prisoners at Sing Sing. The granite structure is 220 feet (67 m) tall at its highest point, and it is one of eleven U.S. state capitols that does not have a domed roof. Tunnels connect it to the Empire State Plaza and Alfred E. Smith Building. The building's exterior underwent restoration from 2000 until fall 2014.

The Assembly Chamber was built with the world's largest open arched span. However, this produced very inconvenient acoustic results. A more serious problem was the structure's shifting foundations that made the vaults unstable. A lower false ceiling was introduced to prevent rock shards from the vaults from falling to the assembly floor.

The Capitol initially featured two large murals by Boston artist William Morris Hunt painted directly on to the Assembly Chamber's sandstone walls. The two enormous works, named The Flight of Night and The Discoverer, each some 45-feet long, were later covered when the Assembly's vaulted ceiling proved unstable and the ceiling was lowered four feet below the murals. Earlier, the murals had been damaged by moisture in the building and had begun to flake. Plans for later murals by Hunt were abandoned due to lack of funding, and some people have speculated the resulting depression experienced by the artist may have contributed to his suicide.

The ceiling murals of battle scenes in the Governor's Reception Room are the work of William de Leftwich Dodge.

In front of the Capitol is an equestrian sculpture of Civil War General Philip Sheridan, designed by John Quincy Adams Ward and Daniel Chester French and completed in 1916.

1911 fire

In the early morning hours of March 29, 1911, four days after the Triangle Shirtwaist Factory fire in Manhattan killed 165 garment workers, a disaster that led to the state being the first to establish a state Department of Labor, a fire started in the Assembly library. Its cause has never been established; theories suggest either an electrical problem or a dropped cigar. A night watchman was the only fatality, but thousands of volumes in the state library, almost its entire collection, and many documents and artifacts in the state museum's collections, then housed in the building, were destroyed. The flames reached  at one point, requiring the evacuation of nearby homes; the fire took 125 firefighters to extinguish.

Heat from the fire was intense enough to twist framing in a skylight above the building's western stairs and melt their sandstone filigree. The building's southwest corner was devastated. It took three months to clear the rubble and then a year to rebuild it, at a cost of $5 million ($ today.)

Visiting and tours

The New York State Capitol is open Monday through Friday from 7 a.m. until 7 p.m. The building is closed most weekends and holidays. Official guided tours of the Capitol are offered at various times on weekdays beginning at the Information Desk located in the State Street Lobby of the Capitol. There is a Visitor Center for the New York State Capitol and Empire State Plaza, located on Concourse Level of the Plaza near the underground entrance to the Capitol.

Official tour guides offers a special Hauntings Tour during October. The best known alleged-ghost is that of Samuel Abbott, a night watchman who died during a severe fire on March 29, 1911.  There is also a "demon" carved into the elaborate stonework, supposedly by an angry stoneworker.

Gallery

See also

List of National Historic Landmarks in New York
List of reportedly haunted locations in the United States
List of tallest buildings in Albany, New York
National Register of Historic Places listings in Albany, New York
List of state and territorial capitols in the United States

References

Further reading
 Capitol Story, Third Edition, SUNY Press, 2014
 Paterson, David (2020). Black, Blind, & In Charge: A Story of Visionary Leadership and Overcoming Adversity. New York: Skyhorse Publishing.

External links

New York State Capitol Virtual Tour 
New York State Capitol at Emporis Buildings
New York State Capitol at Wonders of the World Databank
New York State Capitol Tour Program
New York State Capitol History and Timeline 

New York State Capitol: 30 photos

Buildings with sculpture by Corrado Parducci
Empire State Plaza
Government buildings on the National Register of Historic Places in New York (state)
Government of New York (state)
Henry Hobson Richardson buildings
Historic American Buildings Survey in New York (state)
History museums in New York (state)
Leopold Eidlitz buildings
Museums in Albany, New York
National Historic Landmarks in New York (state)
Reportedly haunted locations in New York (state)
Richardsonian Romanesque architecture in New York (state)
State capitols in the United States
Tourist attractions in Albany, New York
Thomas Fuller buildings
National Register of Historic Places in Albany, New York
Individually listed contributing properties to historic districts on the National Register in New York (state)
Government buildings completed in 1899
1890s architecture in the United States
Skyscrapers in Albany, New York